Papiu Ilarian  (formerly Budiul de Câmpie) is a commune in Mureș County,
Transylvania, Romania composed of five villages:
Dobra / Dobratanya
Merișoru / Bugusalja
Papiu Ilarian
Șandru / Sándortelep
Ursoaia / Urszajatelep

Its first written mention is from 1332 as Budun (Bodon). The prefix "Mező", meaning 'field', in its Hungarian name refers to the Mezőség subregion where it lies.

Romanian politician Alexandru Papiu Ilarian was born here in 1828, and the commune was named after him in 1925.

Demographics
The commune has a Hungarian majority. According to the 2002 census, it has a population of 1,013 of which 56.17% or 569 are Hungarian.

See also 
 List of Hungarian exonyms (Mureș County)

References

Communes in Mureș County
Localities in Transylvania